The Tamor River is a major river in eastern Nepal, which begins around Kanchenjunga. The Tamor and the Arun join the Sun Koshi at Tribenighat to form the giant Saptakoshi which flows through Mahabharat Range on to the Gangetic plain

Koshi river system
The Koshi or Sapta Kosi drains eastern Nepal. It is known as Sapt Koshi because of the seven rivers which join together in east-central Nepal to form this river. The main rivers forming the Koshi system are – the Sun Koshi, the Indravati River, the Bhote Koshi, the Dudh Koshi, Arun River, Barun River, and Tamur River. The combined river flows through the Chatra Gorge in a southerly direction to emerge from the hills.

The Sun Koshi contributes 44 per cent of the total water in the Sapta Koshi, the Arun 37 per cent and the Tamur River 19 per cent.

References

Rivers of Koshi Province